The slender ringtail (Austrolestes analis) is an Australian damselfly in the family Lestidae. It is characterized by having a relatively slender body compared to other species in the genus.

Taxonomy
The slender ringtail was first described by Jules Pierre Rambur in 1862.

Description
The abdomen is 3-3.2 cm long. Mature males are often pale blue and black although the strength of the blue may vary. Distinguished from other Austrolestes by the pattern on the upper thorax, most closely resembling that of Austrolestes aridus.

Distribution and habitat
It is found in south-western Western Australia, south-eastern South Australia, Victoria, New South Wales and Tasmania.

It is active through Spring to Autumn near lakes, slow flowing rivers and nearby vegetation.

Gallery

References

Lestidae
Insects of Australia
Insects described in 1842